Sancho Garcés II (Basque: Antso II.a Gartzez, c. 938 – 994), also known as Sancho II, was King of Pamplona and Count of Aragon from 970 until his death in 994. He was the eldest son of García Sánchez I of Pamplona and Andregoto Galíndez. He recognised the Kingdom of Viguera during his reign.

Nickname 
He is sometimes referred to as Sancho Abarca by modern sources.  This appellation was first applied to Sancho II by chroniclers writing centuries after his time who were confused about the succession to Pamplona, creating a single ruler out of the combined careers of Sancho II and his grandfather Sancho I of Pamplona.  The weight of evidence suggests that this nickname originally applied to Sancho I.

Biography 
Sancho Garcés was born circa 938, son of García Sánchez I of Pamplona, the second King of Pamplona from the Jiménez dynasty, and his first wife Andregoto Galíndez, daughter of Galindo Aznárez II, Count of Aragon. His maternal grandfather died without any legitimate male children, thus passing down the rights to the Count of Aragon to Sancho's mother who, in turn, passed them down to him and he became Count of Aragon, in 948, while still underage. He was initially under the guardianship of Count Fortún Jiménez. After the death of his father in 970, he became King of Pamplona and was known as Sancho II.

He appears mentioned on the occasion of a donation to the monastery of San Juan de la Peña in 987, when he titled himself "king of Navarre", being the first to use said title. This title, however, did not come into common usage until the late eleventh century.

Under Sancho, the kingdom solidified some of the gains of his predecessor, but also suffered several significant military setbacks at the hands of Umayyad troops.  Navarre was linked with the Kingdom of León and the County of Castile by familial bonds, and the realms frequently worked in concert, with the Navarrese monarchy supporting the young Ramiro III of León.

In 972, he founded the monastery of San Andrés de Cirueña. In 976, at the monastery of Albelda, the cultural and intellectual centre of his kingdom, the Codex Vigilanus was completed. It is one of the most important illuminated manuscripts of medieval Spain, containing the canons of the Councils of Toledo, a copy of the Liber Iudiciorum, and the first Western representation of the Arabic numerals, among many other texts.

Upon the death of the Caliph of Cordoba, Al-Hakam II, in 976, and the succession of his son Hisham II, who had been taught by Al-Mansur Ibn Abi Aamir, the prospects of the Christian kingdoms seemed dim. The troops of Al-Mansur defeated the Christians at Torrevicente, south of Soria. Afterwards, the Muslims returned to triumph at Taracueña, near Osma. In 975, Sancho was defeated by the Moors at San Esteban de Gormaz and it has been suggested that he was captured at the Battle of Estercuel that year.

In 981 at the Battle of Rueda, a dozen kilometers from Tordesillas, the Christians suffered another humiliating defeat. Because he could not defeat Al-Mansur by arms, Sancho went to Córdoba as an ambassador for his own kingdom, bringing many gifts for the victorious Al-Mansur, making a pact with him and agreeing to give the Muslim his daughter. From this union was born Abd al-Rahman Sanchuelo, the second successor of Al-Mansur who tried to usurp the Caliphate of Córdoba from the Umayyad heir. He faced further incursions from Almanzor in 989, 991 and 992, the last of which resulted in a second submission at Córdoba, and the next year he sent his son Gonzalo on an embassy to the Caliphate to consolidate the rapprochement. In 994, the year of his death, the kingdom saw yet another incursion by a caliphate army.

After his death in 994,  he was buried in San Estebán de Monjardín and later, he was interred in the Monastery of San Juan de la Peña.

Marriage and children 
Sancho Garcés was married to Urraca Fernández, daughter of the Count of Castile Fernán González. They had four children.

 García Sánchez, King of Pamplona and Count of Aragon from 994 until his death in 1000, and married to Jimena Fernández, daughter of Fernando Bermúdez de Cea, a member of very high rank among the Leonese nobility.
 Ramiro Sánchez, died in 992, when his parents made a donation to San Millán de la Cogolla for the sake of his soul.
 Gonzalo Sánchez, he was given some lands in the Aragon by his brother.
 Urraca or Sancha Sanchez, known in Arabic as Abda and nicknamed "the Basque", having been given by her father to Almanzor, whom she married after converting to Islam. Abda and Almanzor had a single son, named Abd al-Rahman Sanchuelo.

Ancestry

Notes

References

Bibliography 

 
 
 
 
 
 
 
 

930s births
994 deaths
10th-century Navarrese monarchs
House of Jiménez
Counts of Aragon
Burials at the Monastery of San Juan de la Peña